Callitris neocaledonica is a species of conifer in the family Cupressaceae. It is found only in New Caledonia. It is threatened by habitat loss.

References

neocaledonica
Endemic flora of New Caledonia
Trees of New Caledonia
Conservation dependent plants
Taxonomy articles created by Polbot